The Dominican Republic national football team represents the Dominican Republic in men's international football, and is governed by the Dominican Football Federation. The team is a member of the Caribbean Football Union of CONCACAF, the governing body of football in North and Central America and the Caribbean.

As of 23 June 2022, the Dominican Republic is currently ranked 151st in the FIFA World Rankings. The Dominican Republic is one of the few Caribbean nations where football is not the most popular sport. As a result, the Dominican Republic's most popular sport is baseball, which diverts away from many football talents and contributes to its lack of success in any major tournament qualification. As of 2022, the Dominican Republic has never qualified for the FIFA World Cup, nor the CONCACAF Gold Cup.

History
The Dominican Football Federation was founded in 1953 and joined FIFA in 1959. The national team played their first games in May 1967 – a two-legged qualifier against Haiti for a place in the football at the 1968 Summer Olympics of Mexico. The first leg was played at home on 21 May and Haiti won 8–0. The second leg in Haiti was won by the hosts 6–0 on 27 May, as Haiti went through 14–0 on aggregate.

The Dominican Republic did not play another match until March 1970, when they entered at the 1970 Central American and Caribbean Games in Panama. They were placed in a group with Puerto Rico and Venezuela. The Dominican Republic lost 5–0 to Venezuela on 4 March, then gained their first ever win on 6 March by beating Puerto Rico 5–0. They did not advance to the next round.

In 1971 the Dominican Republic entered the 1971 Pan American Games in Colombia and were drawn in a group against the Bahamas and Canada. They lost 4–2 to the Bahamas on 31 July and 4–0 to Canada on 2 August and were knocked out.

The team did not play again until 16 December 1973, when they lost 1–0 away to Venezuela. In 1974 the Dominican Republic held the Central American and Caribbean Games, and lost their first match 3–2 to Bermuda on 28 February. On 2 March the team lost 1–0 to Mexico, before beating the Bahamas 2–0 on 4 March. In the final group game on 8 March the Dominican Republic lost 3–2 to Panama and were knocked out.

In 2012 the Dominicans were able to qualify for the 2012 Caribbean Cup. On 7 December they beat hosts Antigua and Barbuda 2–1 but fell 2–1 against Haiti and Trinidad and Tobago.

Results and fixtures
The following is a list of match results in the last 12 months, as well as any future matches that have been scheduled.

2022

2023

Coaching staff

Coaching history

 Fortunato Quispe Mendoza (1968–1974)
 Carlos Cabañés (1975)
 Bernhard Zgoll (1992)
 Juan Carretero (1996)
 Juan Emilio Mojica (2000–2002)
 Santiago Morel (2002)
 Carmelo Oliva (2003)
 William Bennett (2004–2005)
 Ljubomir Crnokrak (2005–2007)
 Juan Emilio Mojica (2008–2009)
 Clemente Domingo Hernández (2010–2014)
 José Eugenio Hernández (2015)
 Juan Emilio Mojica  (2015)
 Roberto Díaz Bernabé  (2015–2016)
 Juan Emilio Mojica (2017)
 Orlando Capellino (2017–2019)
 David González  (2019–2020)
 Jacques Passy (2020–2021)
 Iñaki Bea (2022)
 Marcelo Neveleff (2023-)

Players

Current squad
The following players have been called up for the 2022–23 CONCACAF Nations matches against French Guiana and Belize on 24 and 28 March 2023 respectively.

Caps and goals are correct as of 19 November 2022, after the second match against Cuba

Recent callups
The following players have been called up for the team in the last 12 months and are still available for selection.

Notes
INJ = Withdrew due to injury
PRE = Preliminary squad
RET = Retired from the national team
SUS = Serving suspension
WD = Player withdrew from the squad due to non-injury issue.

Records
Unofficial records

Players in bold are still active with the Dominican Republic.

Most appearances

Top goalscorers

Competitive record

FIFA World Cup

CONCACAF Gold Cup

CONCACAF Nations League

CFU Caribbean Cup

Pan American Games

See also

 Dominican Republic national under-20 football team
 Dominican Republic national under-17 football team
 Football in the Dominican Republic

References

External links
 Official website 
 Dominican Republic FIFA profile

 
Caribbean national association football teams